Lists of ports cover ports of various types, maritime facilities with one or more wharves where ships may dock to load and discharge passengers and cargo. 
Most are on the sea coast or an estuary, but some are many miles inland, with access to the sea via river or canal.
The lists are organized by shipping volume, by ocean or sea, by nation or sub-region, and by other characteristics.

Lists of busiest ports

 Lists of the world's busiest ports – list of ports that claim to be the world's busiest by various measures
 List of busiest container ports – by number of twenty-foot equivalent units (TEUs) transported through the port
 List of busiest ports by cargo tonnage – by weight of cargo transported through the port
 List of busiest ports in Europe – by several measures including number of twenty-foot equivalent units (TEUs) handled, by cargo tonnage and percentage transshipment
 List of busiest cruise ports by passengers

Lists by ocean or sea
 List of ports and harbours of the Atlantic Ocean
 Ports of the Baltic Sea
 Channel Ports – ports and harbours of the English Channel
 List of North Sea ports – ports of the North Sea and its influent rivers
 List of coastal settlements of the Mediterranean Sea
 List of ports and harbors of the Arctic Ocean
 List of ports and harbours of the Indian Ocean
 List of ports and harbors of the Pacific Ocean
 Southern Ocean – See :Category: Ports and harbors of Antarctica
 Iceports
 Ice pier – McMurdo Station

National and sub-national lists

 List of ports in Albania
 List of ports in Argentina
 List of ports in Australia
 List of ports in Belgium
 Ports in Bangladesh
 List of ports in Cape Verde
 List of ports in China
 List of ferries, wharfs and ports in Guangzhou
 List of ports in Denmark
 List of ports in England and Wales
 List of Liverpool Docks
 List of locations in the Port of London
 List of ports and harbours in Estonia
 List of ports in Finland
 List of ports in Greece
 Ports in India
 List of ports in Indonesia
 Israel Port Authority
 List of ports in Ireland
 List of ports in Iraq
 List of seaports in Mexico
 Myanma Port Authority
 Nigerian Ports Authority
 List of ports in the Philippines
 List of ports in Portugal
 List of ports in Romania
 List of ports and harbours in Scotland
 Ports and harbours in South Africa
 List of ports in Spain
 List of seaports of the Valencian Community
 List of ports in Sri Lanka
 List of ports in Turkey
 List of ports in Ukraine
 List of ports in the United States
 Marsa Maroc

Dry ports
 Dry port (includes lists by continent)
 List of dry ports in Pakistan – inland inter-modal transshipment ports

Other lists
 List of Chinese treaty ports
 List of free ports
 List of Panamax ports
 List of marinas

See also

List of ports (disambiguation)
 American Association of Port Authorities
 International Association of Ports and Harbors
 Port authority

External links

 Search Enabled World Port List Database at www. nslworld.net
 Bunker IQ – Mobile directory for the Bunkering industry.
 GoScopia.com – Find nearest seaports and airports.
 Port database at portsdb.com